is a passenger railway station in the city of Hashimoto, Wakayama Prefecture, Japan, operated by the private railway company Nankai Electric Railway.

Lines
Rinkanden-entoshi Station is served by the Nankai Kōya Line, and is located 39.9 kilometers from the terminus of the line at Shiomibashi Station and 39.2 kilometers from Namba Station.

Station layout
The station consists of one island platform and one side platform connected by an elevated station building. The station is staffed.

Platforms

Adjacent stations

History
Rinkanden-entoshi Station opened on November 22, 1981.

Passenger statistics
In fiscal 2019, the station was used by an average of 7945 passengers daily (boarding passengers only).

Surrounding area
 Nankai Hashimoto Rinkan Den'en-toshi New City
 Kimi Kita Junior High School
 Kimi Higashi Junior High School

See also
List of railway stations in Japan

References

External links

 Rinkanden-entoshi Station Official Site

Railway stations in Japan opened in 1981
Railway stations in Wakayama Prefecture
Hashimoto, Wakayama